Yermekeyevsky District (Yärmäkäy rayonı; , Yarmäkäy rayonı) is an administrative and municipal district (raion), one of the fifty-four in the Republic of Bashkortostan, Russia. It is located in the west of the republic and borders with Tuymazinsky District in the north, Belebeyevsky District in the east, Bizhbulyaksky District in the southeast, and with Orenburg Oblast and the Republic of Tatarstan in the west. Its administrative center is the rural locality (a selo) of Yermekeyevo. As of the 2010 Census, the total population of the district was 17,162, with the population of Yermekeyevo accounting for 22.9% of that number.

History
The district was established on January 31, 1935.

Administrative and municipal status
Within the framework of administrative divisions, Yermekeyevsky District is one of the fifty-four in the Republic of Bashkortostan. The district is divided into thirteen selsoviets, comprising fifty-one rural localities. As a municipal division, the district is incorporated as Yermekeyevsky Municipal District. Its thirteen selsoviets are incorporated as thirteen rural settlements within the municipal district. The selo of Yermekeyevo serves as the administrative center of both the administrative and municipal district.

References

Notes

Sources

Districts of Bashkortostan
States and territories established in 1935